Palomino Fino is a white grape widely grown in Spain and South Africa, and best known for its use in the manufacture of sherry. It is also grown in the Douro region of Portugal where it is used for table and fortified wines.

Wine regions

In Spain, the grape is split into the sub-varieties Palomino Fino, Palomino Basto, and Palomino de Jerez, of which Palomino Fino is by far the most important, being the principal grape used in the manufacture of sherry. The wine formed by fermentation of the grape is low in both acidity and sugar which, whilst suitable for sherry, ensures that any table wine made from it is of a consistently low quality, unless aided by acidification. There are substantial plantings in Andalusia for sherry production, and it is also widely grown on the Canary Islands, and in Galicia.

In France, it is referred to as Listán, and in South Africa as Fransdruif or White French. It is also found in Australia and California where it is also used mainly to produce fortified wines. The grape was once thought to be the Golden Chasselas, a grape grown in California. The wine-must has tendency to oxidise quickly, a characteristic that can be ignored when used for sherry production.

Synonyms 

The Palomino Fino grape is also known as Alban, Albar, Albilla, Albillo de Lucena, Antillana, Assario, Assario Do Alentejo, Bayoud, Bayoud Merseguera, Blanc d'Algerie, Blanc d'Anjou, Blanc de Bordeaux, Blanc Leroy, Blanca Castellana, Blanca Extra, Blanco Jerez, Chasselas de Jesús, Cherin Blanc, Chering Blanc, Conil, Diagalves, Doradillo, Dorado, El Bayoudh, Faranah, Fransdruif, Gencibel, Genciber, Gencibera, Gencibiera, Golden, Chasselas, Grenade, Grillo, Guignard de Saintours 1, Horgazuela, Jerez, Jerez de la Frontera, Jerez Dorado, Jerez Fina, Jerez Fino, Jerezana, Katalon Letnii, Katalon Zimnij, Abrusco, Lacet, Lairenes Vertes, Laket, Lista Blanco, Listán, Listán Blanc, Listán Blanca, Listán Blanco, Listán Blanco de Canarias, Listán Común, Listán de Drinada, Listán de Drinado, Listán Ladrenado, Listán Laeren, Listán Letnii, Listán Tardif, Listán White French, Listao, Listao de Madeira, Listrao, Malvasia Rei, Malvazia, Malvazia Rei, Mantuo de Pilyas, Manzanilla, Manzanilla de Sanlúcar, Merseguera, Motril, Mourisco, Neiran d'Alle, Ojo de Liebre, Olho de Lebre, Orcaculo Orgazuela, Palomilla, Palomillo, Palomina, Palomina Blanca, Palomina Blanche, Palomino, Palomino 84, Palomino Basto, Palomino de Chipiona, Palomino de Jerez, Palomino del Pinchito, Palomino Fino de Xeres, Palomino Listan, Palomino Peluson, Palominos, Palote, Paulo, Perola do Alentejo, Perrum, Point Noir, Polomino, Punchi Neri, Qis Katalonu, Sardoa Portalegre, Seminario, Temprana, Temprana Blanca, Tempranas Blancas, Tempranas Blanches, Tempranilla, Tempranilla Blanca Listán, Tempranillo de Granada, Tempranillo de Grenada, Temprano, Useiran d'Alle, Verdalou, White French, White French Fransdruif, Winter Catalon, Xeres, and Xerez y Zarcillada.

References

External links
Palomino and other sherry grapes on SherryNotes

White wine grape varieties
Fortified wine
Grape varieties of Spain